Lăpușnicu Mare is a commune in Caraș-Severin County, western Romania with a population of 1,986 people. It is composed of two villages, Lăpușnicu Mare and Moceriș (Mocsáros).

References

Communes in Caraș-Severin County
Localities in Romanian Banat